An EMD GP50 is a 4-axle diesel-electric locomotive built by General Motors Electro-Motive Division (EMD). BN 3110-3162 were all delivered with five cab seats, the final five of these having the cab lengthened  vs. the standard EMD cab.

History
EMD delivered the first GP50s to Chicago Northwestern in the summer of 1980. Much of the GP50's new technology was tested and developed with the experimental GP40X. 

Changes to the 645F3B engine compared to older versions, include a stronger crankcase, new turbocharger, new plate crab for clamping the power assemblies to the crankshaft, a camshaft of increased hardness, one-half-inch-diameter plunger injectors, laser-hardened cylinder liners, rocking piston pins, and a slower idle speed. A new traction motor, the D87, has a continuous rating of 1170 amps, compared to 1150 amps for its predecessor, the D77, with new interpole and main field coils that use 16% more copper, the number of turns increased from 14 to 17 to improve commutation at high currents, longer brush life, and sturdier gearing with increased surface hardness. The new motors are connected in permanent parallel to a new AR15 alternator rated at 4,680 amps.

The GP50 was the first production locomotive to feature EMD's Super Series wheelslip control system, first seen on the GP40X. Super Series employs a Doppler radar unit mounted under the front coupler pocket to measure the locomotive's speed and adjusts the power to each axle to provide maximum adhesion while eliminating wheelslip. This system provided an increase in adhesion of at least 33% compared to conventional locomotives.

Other changes compared to the GP40-2 include an underframe with a lighter, deeper sill that reduced the frame's weight and a new exhaust system and "Q-type" cooling fans to meet January 1980 Federal noise regulations.

The GP50 was the first production locomotive series to be fitted with a microprocessor, and EMD fitted the 60 series with microprocessors as standard following the success of LARS which was developed in partnership with Burlington Northern and Rockwell Collins.

Original Owners

Rebuilds

Norfolk Southern 
In 2015–2016 the Norfolk Southern Railway rebuilt 28 of their GP50s into the low-emission GP33ECO. And in early 2016, Norfolk Southern rebuilt one GP50 into their first GP59ECO. These units, most of which utilized GP59 cores, have similar specifications as the earlier GP33ECO program but have been built without public funding contributing to their construction.

Burlington Northern Santa Fe 
Around 2006 BNSF started rebuilding and derating GP50s and reclassifying them as GP25s. These locomotives are regoverned to 2500 hp and have D78 traction motors in place of the original D87s. This likely means that the Super Series wheelslip control system has also been removed since the D78 traction motor does not support it.

See Also 
 EMD
 EMD 50 Series

References

External links 

 Sarberenyi, Robert. EMD GP39X, GP49, and GP50 Original Owners

EMD 50 Series locomotives
GP50
B-B locomotives
Diesel-electric locomotives of the United States
Railway locomotives introduced in 1980
Freight locomotives
Standard gauge locomotives of the United States
Diesel-electric locomotives of Jamaica
Standard gauge locomotives of Jamaica